Events from the year 1678 in China.

Incumbents 
 Kangxi Emperor (17th year)

Events 
 The Revolt of the Three Feudatories continues
 Wu Sangui declares himself Emperor of Zhou. A few months later he dies of apparent natural causes on October 2, his grandson Wu Shifan continues the rebellion.
 Sino-Russian border conflicts

Deaths
 Wu Sangui

References

 
 .

 
China